The 1943–44 season was the fifth Scottish football season in which Dumbarton competed in regional football during World War II.

Scottish Southern League

Dumbarton had their best performance to date in their fourth season in the Scottish Southern League.  Indeed, for two weeks in October 1943 Dumbarton topped the league.  However with only two wins recorded after the New Year it was a 5th place finish out of 16 that was achieved with 32 points - 18 behind champions Rangers.  Nevertheless the league results included a first ever league win over Celtic at Celtic Park.

League Cup South

Despite an unbeaten away record, Dumbarton failed to qualify from their section in the League Cup South.

Summer Cup

Dumbarton suffered a heavy defeat at the hands of Clyde in the first round of the Summer Cup.

Player statistics

|}

Source:

Transfers

Players in

Players out 

In addition George Henderson and John Honeyman both played their last games in Dumbarton 'colours'.

Source:

Reserve team
Dumbarton continued to run a Second XI during the season.

In the Scottish Second XI Cup, Dumbarton lost in the second round to St Mirren, and finished as runners-up in the Glasgow & District Reserve League (First Series).

References

Dumbarton F.C. seasons
Scottish football clubs 1943–44 season